Tabernacle Township is a township in Burlington County, in the U.S. state of New Jersey. As of the 2020 United States census, the township's population was 6,776, a decrease of 173 (−2.5%) from the 2010 census count of 6,949, which in turn reflected a decline of 221 (−3.1%) from the 7,170 counted in the 2000 census.

Tabernacle was incorporated as a township by an act of the New Jersey Legislature on March 22, 1901, from portions of Shamong Township, Southampton Township and Woodland Township. The township was named for a tabernacle constructed by missionaries David and John Brainerd.

New Jersey Monthly magazine ranked Tabernacle Township as its 23rd best place to live in its 2008 rankings of the "Best Places To Live" in New Jersey. New Jersey Monthly magazine ranked Tabernacle Township as its sixth-best place to live in its 2010 rankings of the "Best Places To Live" in New Jersey. In 2009, it was rated the #1 small town by South Jersey Magazine.

History

Before 1900
The region now known as Tabernacle was originally inhabited by the Lenape Native Americans. In 1778, John Brainerd established a Christian church, called Tabernacle In The Wilderness, in the area with the intention of converting the local Native Americans to Christianity. In 1803, William Wilkins sold land to 28 individuals to construct the Tabernacle Cemetery, adjacent to the church.

The church also served as a schoolhouse, but with the growth of the community, a one-room school was built on the future site of the Tabernacle Town Hall in 1856.

A sawmill was erected in the Friendship area during the early 1700s.

Around 1860, Gilbert Knight constructed the Knight-Pepper House near the Town Hall, which was later sold to the Scott and Pepper families. Following Clara Pepper's death in 1987, the property was turned over to the Tabernacle Historic Society. In the 1880s, issues arose in Tabernacle, and a new church was built on the site. This church, named the Tabernacle Methodist Episcopal Church, still stands today.

After 1900
On March 22, 1901, Tabernacle was incorporated as a township by an act of New Jersey Legislature from portions of Shamong Township, Southampton Township, and Woodland Township.

On July 13, 1928, Emilio Carranza (known as the Lindbergh of Mexico) was flying his plane from New York City to Mexico when he crashed during a storm over Tabernacle. The Carranza Monument was built with funds from Mexican schoolchildren, Hampton Gates Road was renamed Carranza Road for the pilot.

In 1909, the one-room schoolhouse was demolished.  A two-room schoolhouse was built on the site. In 1936, it was moved down the road and two more rooms were added. In the 1950s, Tabernacle Elementary School was built on New Road, and Olson Middle School (formerly Tabernacle Middle School) was built across the road in 1968. Tabernacle School District renamed its school after Kenneth R. Olson following his death in 1990. In 2003, Seneca High School was built to serve high school students from Tabernacle, Shamong, Southampton, and Woodland Townships.

Suburbanization
In 1970, Tabernacle had a population of 2,103, but by 1980, it had almost tripled to 6,236, reflecting the rapid suburbanization of the Philadelphia region in South Jersey. Around the same time, many other nearby towns experienced a population boom. Tabernacle's population peaked at 7,362 residents in 1990 and has gradually declined since then. In 2000 there were 7,170 residents in the township, which further dropped to 6,949 in the 2010 Census.

Geography
According to the United States Census Bureau, the township had a total area of 49.63 square miles (128.54 km2), including 49.20 square miles (127.43 km2) of land and 0.43 square miles (1.11 km2) of water (0.86%).

Unincorporated communities, localities and place names located partially or completely within the township include Apple Pie Hill, Bozuretown, Carranza Monument, Eagle, Fairview, Fox Chase, Friendship, Hampton Gate, Harris, Oriental, Paisley, Pine Crest, Sandy Ridge, Sooy Place, South Park, Speedwell and White Horse Station.

The township borders the Burlington County municipalities of Medford Township, Shamong Township, Southampton Township, Washington Township and Woodland Township.

The township is one of 56 South Jersey municipalities that are included within the New Jersey Pinelands National Reserve, a protected natural area of unique ecology covering , that has been classified as a United States Biosphere Reserve and established by Congress in 1978 as the nation's first National Reserve. All of the township is included in the state-designated Pinelands Area, which includes portions of Burlington County, along with areas in Atlantic, Camden, Cape May, Cumberland, Gloucester and Ocean counties.

Demographics

2010 census

The Census Bureau's 2006–2010 American Community Survey showed that (in 2010 inflation-adjusted dollars) median household income was $101,053 (with a margin of error of +/– $15,205) and the median family income was $107,179 (+/– $7,238). Males had a median income of $47,947 (+/– $13,091) versus $40,231 (+/– $18,026) for females. The per capita income for the borough was $36,726 (+/– $3,161). About 1.1% of families and 2.5% of the population were below the poverty line, including 0.4% of those under age 18 and none of those age 65 or over.

2000 census
As of the 2000 United States census there were 7,170 people, 2,346 households, and 2,010 families residing in the township. The racial makeup of the township was 96.29% White, 2.09% African American, 0.10% Native American, 0.73% Asian, 0.31% from other races, and 0.49% from two or more races. Hispanic or Latino of any race were 1.48% of the population.

There were 2,346 households, out of which 41.6% had children under the age of 18 living with them, 77.6% were married couples living together, 5.2% had a female householder with no husband present, and 14.3% were non-families. 11.4% of all households were made up of individuals, and 4.7% had someone living alone who was 65 years of age or older. The average household size was 3.03 and the average family size was 3.28.

In the township the population was spread out, with 27.9% under the age of 18, 7.1% from 18 to 24, 28.2% from 25 to 44, 29.8% from 45 to 64, and 7.0% who were 65 years of age or older. The median age was 38 years. For every 100 females, there were 102.7 males.  For every 100 females age 18 and over, there were 100.5 males.

The median income for a household in the township was $76,432, and the median income for a family was $86,729. Males had a median income of $58,148 versus $31,250 for females. The per capita income for the township was $27,874.  About 1.1% of families and 2.0% of the population were below the Poverty threshold, including 1.1% of those under age 18 and 6.0% of those age 65 or over.

Parks and recreation

 The Carranza Monument – A  monument in the Wharton State Forest that marks the site of the July 13, 1928, crash of Emilio Carranza, known as "The Lindbergh of Mexico". The monument, installed with funds donated by Mexican schoolchildren, depicts a falling eagle of Aztec design. Every July on the Saturday nearest the anniversary of his crash (second Saturday in July) at 1:00 p.m., he is honored at the monument site by local residents and representatives from the Mexican consulates in New York City and Philadelphia.
 Delanco Camp – An inter-denominational Christian camp meeting and summer camp along Lake Agape, located here since 1964, preaching under the Wesleyan doctrine.
In September 2016, chronic vandalism led the New Jersey Department of Environmental Protection to eliminate access to Apple Pie Hill by erecting a fence around the tower; access is possible when New Jersey Forest Fire Service Division personnel are at the site.

Government

Local government

Tabernacle Township is governed under the Township form of New Jersey municipal government, one of 141 municipalities (of the 564) statewide that use this form, the second-most commonly used form of government in the state. The Township Committee is comprised of five members, who are elected directly by the voters at-large in partisan elections to serve three-year terms of office on a staggered basis, with either one or two seats coming up for election each year as part of the November general election in a three-year cycle. At an annual reorganization meeting held during the first week of January after each election, the Township Committee selects one of its members to serve as Mayor and another as Deputy Mayor.

, members of the Tabernacle Township Committee are Mayor Samuel R. Moore III (R, term on committee ends December 31, 2024; term as mayor ends 2022), Deputy Mayor Kimberly A. "Kim" Brown (R, term on committee ends 2023; term as deputy mayor ends 2022), Mark Hartman (R, 2024; appointed to serve an unexpired term), Nancy K. McGinnis (R, 2022) and Robert C. Sunbury Jr. (R, 2022).

In January 2022, the Township Committee appointed Mark Hartman to fill the seat expiring in December 2024 that had been held Matthew Baals until he resigned the previous month, shortly after taking office, citing "time commitment issues". Hartman will serve on an interim basis until the November 2022 general election, when voters will choose a candidate to serve the balance of the term of office.

The township is patrolled by Troop C of the New Jersey State Police at the Red Lion Barracks in Southampton Township.

Federal, state, and county representation 
Tabernacle Township is located in the 3rd Congressional District and is part of New Jersey's 9th state legislative district. Prior to the 2011 reapportionment following the 2010 Census, Tabernacle Township had been in the 8th state legislative district.

 

Burlington County is governed by a Board of County Commissioners comprised of five members who are chosen at-large in partisan elections to serve three-year terms of office on a staggered basis, with either one or two seats coming up for election each year; at an annual reorganization meeting, the board selects a director and deputy director from among its members to serve a one-year term. , Burlington County's Commissioners are
Director Felicia Hopson (D, Willingboro Township, term as commissioner ends December 31, 2024; term as director ends 2023),
Deputy Director Tom Pullion (D, Edgewater Park, term as commissioner and as deputy director ends 2023),
Allison Eckel (D, Medford, 2025),
Daniel J. O'Connell (D, Delran Township, 2024) and 
Balvir Singh (D, Burlington Township, 2023). 
Burlington County's Constitutional Officers are
County Clerk Joanne Schwartz (R, Southampton Township, 2023)
Sheriff James H. Kostoplis (D, Bordentown, 2025) and 
Surrogate Brian J. Carlin (D, Burlington Township, 2026).

Politics
As of March 2011, there were a total of 5,022 registered voters in Tabernacle Township, of which 981 (19.5% vs. 33.3% countywide) were registered as Democrats, 1,916 (38.2% vs. 23.9%) were registered as Republicans and 2,122 (42.3% vs. 42.8%) were registered as Unaffiliated. There were 3 voters registered as Libertarians or Greens. Among the township's 2010 Census population, 72.3% (vs. 61.7% in Burlington County) were registered to vote, including 95.2% of those ages 18 and over (vs. 80.3% countywide).

In the 2012 presidential election, Republican Mitt Romney received 2,247 votes here (58.4% vs. 40.2% countywide), ahead of Democrat Barack Obama with 1,525 votes (39.6% vs. 58.1%) and other candidates with 49 votes (1.3% vs. 1.0%), among the 3,848 ballots cast by the township's 5,202 registered voters, for a turnout of 74.0% (vs. 74.5% in Burlington County). In the 2008 presidential election, Republican John McCain received 2,216 votes here (56.4% vs. 39.9% countywide), ahead of Democrat Barack Obama with 1,635 votes (41.6% vs. 58.4%) and other candidates with 53 votes (1.3% vs. 1.0%), among the 3,926 ballots cast by the township's 4,978 registered voters, for a turnout of 78.9% (vs. 80.0% in Burlington County). In the 2004 presidential election, Republican George W. Bush received 2,345 votes here (59.4% vs. 46.0% countywide), ahead of Democrat John Kerry with 1,544 votes (39.1% vs. 52.9%) and other candidates with 45 votes (1.1% vs. 0.8%), among the 3,950 ballots cast by the township's 4,991 registered voters, for a turnout of 79.1% (vs. 78.8% in the whole county).

In the 2013 gubernatorial election, Republican Chris Christie received 1,850 votes here (74.5% vs. 61.4% countywide), ahead of Democrat Barbara Buono with 557 votes (22.4% vs. 35.8%) and other candidates with 36 votes (1.4% vs. 1.2%), among the 2,484 ballots cast by the township's 5,150 registered voters, yielding a 48.2% turnout (vs. 44.5% in the county). In the 2009 gubernatorial election, Republican Chris Christie received 1,682 votes here (63.8% vs. 47.7% countywide), ahead of Democrat Jon Corzine with 778 votes (29.5% vs. 44.5%), Independent Chris Daggett with 127 votes (4.8% vs. 4.8%) and other candidates with 27 votes (1.0% vs. 1.2%), among the 2,636 ballots cast by the township's 5,009 registered voters, yielding a 52.6% turnout (vs. 44.9% in the county).

Education 

The Tabernacle School District serves public school students in pre-kindergarten through eighth grade. As of the 2020–21 school year, the district, comprised of two schools, had an enrollment of 658 students and 53.4 classroom teachers (on an FTE basis), for a student–teacher ratio of 12.3:1. Schools in the district (with 2020–21 enrollment data from the National Center for Education Statistics) are 
Tabernacle Elementary School with students in Pre-K–4 and 
Kenneth R. Olson Middle School with students in grades 5–8.

Public school students in Tabernacle Township in ninth through twelfth grades attend Seneca High School located in Tabernacle Township, which serves students in ninth through twelfth grade from Shamong, Southampton, Tabernacle and Woodland Townships. The school is part of the Lenape Regional High School District, which also serves students from Evesham Township, Medford Lakes, Medford Township, Mount Laurel Township, Shamong Township and Woodland Township. As of the 2020–21 school year, the high school had an enrollment of 1,073 students and 103.6 classroom teachers (on an FTE basis), for a student–teacher ratio of 10.4:1.

Students from Tabernacle Township, and from all of Burlington County, are eligible to attend the Burlington County Institute of Technology, a countywide public school district that serves the vocational and technical education needs of students at the high school and post-secondary level at its campuses in Medford and Westampton.

Transportation

The two major roads that pass through are County Route 532 through the central part and U.S. Route 206 in the west.

The Atlantic City Expressway, Garden State Parkway, Interstate 295 and New Jersey Turnpike are all accessible two towns away.

There are only two traffic lights in Tabernacle, both on U.S. Route 206.

Notable people

People who were born in, residents of, or otherwise closely associated with Tabernacle Township include:

 Howard P. Boyd (born 1914), scientist who has specialized in the study of the Pine Barrens
 Sean Doolittle (born 1986), Major League Baseball relief pitcher for the Washington Nationals
 Shana Hiatt (born 1975), model and host of Poker After Dark
 Brandon Taylor (born 1994), professional basketball player for Jämtland Basket of the Basketligan

References

External links

 
1901 establishments in New Jersey
Populated places in the Pine Barrens (New Jersey)
Populated places established in 1901
Township form of New Jersey government
Townships in Burlington County, New Jersey